Carlos Alberto Gomes Parreira (born 27 February 1943) is a Brazilian former football manager who holds the record for attending the most FIFA World Cup final tournaments as manager with six appearances. He also managed five different national teams in five editions of the FIFA World Cup. He managed Brazil to victory at the 1994 World Cup, the 2004 Copa América, and the 2005 Confederations Cup. He is also the only manager to have led two different Asian teams to conquer the AFC Asian Cup.

He last managed the South Africa national football team.

Parreira is one of the most successful managers to have never played football himself.

Coaching career
Parreira supports Fluminense, and he has won two league titles for the club: The First Division Brazilian Championship in 1984 and the Third Division in 1999. About the latter title, Parreira has said that this was personally the most important trophy of his career, even more so than Brazil's World Cup triumph, as the club he loved was facing near-bankruptcy and became very close to extinction at the time.

Parreira is one of two coaches that has led five national teams to the World Cup: Kuwait in 1982, United Arab Emirates in 1990, Brazil in 1994 and 2006, Saudi Arabia in 1998 and South Africa in 2010. The other coach, Bora Milutinović, reached this record when he led a fifth team in 2002. Parreira was also involved with the 1970 championship team for Brazil, which he claims was an inspiration for him to aspire to be a national football coach.

In 1997, Parreira coached the MetroStars of the American Major League Soccer. He also coached Fenerbahçe in Turkey and won a Turkish League Championship. Parreira was in charge of Corinthians in 2002, which gave him two of the most important national trophies of 2002: The Brazilian Cup and the Torneio Rio-São Paulo, besides being runner up at the Brazilian League.

When coaching Saudi Arabia at the 1998 World Cup in France, he was fired after two matches, one of three managers to be sacked during the tournament.

Parreira repeatedly turned down offers to coach Brazil again between 1998 and 2002 World Cups. In end of 2000, when the team was in turmoil after firing Vanderlei Luxemburgo, he refused the post, stating that he did not want to relive the stress and pressure of winning the World Cup again. There were public cries again to replace Luiz Felipe Scolari for Parreira in July 2001 when Brazil lost two matches to Mexico and Honduras in its title defense at the 2001 Copa América in Colombia, especially after last minute invitee (replacing Argentina who dropped out one day before the kickoff) Honduras defeated 2–0 and eliminated the favorite Brazil in quarter finals round on July 23, 2001. Parreira only stated that he would indirectly assist Scolari in the 2002 campaign. After the 2002 World Cup, Parreira took part in drafting a technical report of the tournament. He was named coach along with Mario Zagallo as assistant director in January 2003, with the goal of defending their World Cup title in Germany 2006, but on July 1, 2006 Brazil was defeated and eliminated 0–1 by France in the quarterfinals.

After Brazil's exit from the World Cup, Parreira was heavily criticized by the Brazilian public and media for playing an outdated brand of football and not using the players available to him properly. Parreira subsequently resigned on July 19, 2006. He coached Brazil to victory in the 1994 FIFA World Cup and was the coach of the South Africa national football team until resigning in April 2008. On October 22, 2009 it was announced he would return as head coach of South Africa. He announced a verbal agreement with the South African Football Association on October 23, 2009.

He resumed coaching South Africa in 2009 in time for the 2010 World Cup. In South Africa, his team drew with Mexico, 1–1, in the tournament opener, lost to Uruguay, 3–0, and beat France, 2–1, to finish third in Group A. After the France game, he tried to shake hands with French coach Raymond Domenech but the latter refused.

On 25 June 2010 he announced his retirement as football coach.

Career statistics

Fitness coach
São Cristóvão (1967)
Vasco da Gama (1969)
Brazil (1970)
Fluminense (1970–1974)

Assistant coach
Brazil (Olympic Team) (1972)
Kuwait (1976–1977)

FIFA World Cup matches
Parreira has coached national squads in 23 games in FIFA World Cup finals. Parreira's coaching record is 10–4–9 (Wins-Draws-Losses). His teams have scored 28 goals and conceded 32.  Below is a list of all matches, along with their outcomes:

1982 FIFA World Cup

1990 FIFA World Cup

1994 FIFA World Cup

1998 FIFA World Cup

2006 FIFA World Cup

2010 FIFA World Cup

Honours

Manager

Club
Fluminense
Série A: 1984
Série C: 1999

Fenerbahçe
Süper Lig: 1995–96

Corinthians
Torneio Rio – São Paulo: 2002
Copa do Brasil: 2002

International
Kuwait
Arabian Gulf Cup: 1982
AFC Asian Cup: 1980

Brazil
Amistad Cup: 1992
FIFA World Cup: 1994
Copa América: 2004
FIFA Confederations Cup: 2005
Lunar New Year Cup: 2005

Saudi Arabia
AFC Asian Cup: 1988

South Africa
COSAFA Cup: 2007

Individual
World Soccer Magazine World Manager of the Year: 1994
 IFFHS World's Best National Coach: 2005

See also
List of Brazil national football team managers

References

1943 births
Living people
Brazilian people of Portuguese descent
Sportspeople from Rio de Janeiro (city)
Brazilian football managers
Ghana national football team managers
Fluminense FC managers
Kuwait national football team non-playing staff
Kuwait national football team managers
Brazil national football team managers
United Arab Emirates national football team managers
Saudi Arabia national football team managers
Clube Atlético Bragantino managers
Valencia CF managers
Fenerbahçe football managers
São Paulo FC managers
New York Red Bulls coaches
Clube Atlético Mineiro managers
Santos FC managers
Sport Club Internacional managers
Sport Club Corinthians Paulista managers
South Africa national soccer team managers
Brazil national football team non-playing staff
Campeonato Brasileiro Série A managers
La Liga managers
Süper Lig managers
1968 African Cup of Nations managers
1980 AFC Asian Cup managers
1982 FIFA World Cup managers
1983 Copa América managers
1988 AFC Asian Cup managers
1990 FIFA World Cup managers
1993 Copa América managers
1994 FIFA World Cup managers
1998 FIFA World Cup managers
2003 FIFA Confederations Cup managers
2004 Copa América managers
2005 FIFA Confederations Cup managers
2006 FIFA World Cup managers
2008 Africa Cup of Nations managers
2010 FIFA World Cup managers
FIFA World Cup-winning managers
FIFA Confederations Cup-winning managers
AFC Asian Cup-winning managers
Brazilian expatriate football managers
Brazilian expatriate sportspeople in Ghana
Brazilian expatriate sportspeople in Kuwait
Brazilian expatriate sportspeople in the United Arab Emirates
Brazilian expatriate sportspeople in Saudi Arabia
Brazilian expatriate sportspeople in Spain
Brazilian expatriate sportspeople in Turkey
Brazilian expatriate sportspeople in the United States
Brazilian expatriate sportspeople in South Africa
Expatriate football managers in Ghana
Expatriate football managers in Kuwait
Expatriate football managers in the United Arab Emirates
Expatriate football managers in Saudi Arabia
Expatriate football managers in Spain
Expatriate football managers in Turkey
Expatriate soccer managers in the United States
Expatriate soccer managers in South Africa